The 2014 Durand Cup was the 127th season of the Durand Cup, the third oldest football tournament in the world, which is a knock-out competition held in India. Mohammedan were the defending champions, having beaten ONGC 2–1 in the 2013 Final, but were knocked out in the quarter finals.

The tournament was held from 20 October to 8 November with all matches in Goa. Salgaocar won the cup when they defeated Pune 1–0 in the final.

Teams
This edition of the Durand Cup saw 25 teams taking part in the tournament, 9 of which were directly seeded into Quarter Finals and remaining teams fighting it out in the Qualification Round for the 3 spots remaining.

Preliminary round
Preliminary round was a knockout round and held between 20 October and 27 October. Vasco S.C., Laxmi Prasad S.C. and SESA F.A. qualified for the main draw.

Bracket

Round 1

Round 2

Round 3

Qualifier

Quarter-finals

The quarter-finals of the Durand Cup will be played between 12 teams.

Group A

Group B

Group C

Group D

Semi-finals

Final

Scorers
All goals from tournament proper. Goals from qualifiers are not counted in this list.

4 goals
  Boima Karpeh (Sporting Goa)

3 goals

  David Opara (Laxmi Prasad)
  Douhou Pierre (Salgaocar)
  Sunil Chhetri (Bengaluru)

2 goals

  Anthony Wolfe (Sporting Goa)
  Bineesh Balan (Pune)
  Sujay Oraon (United)

1 goal

  Alfred Jaryan (Mohammedan)
  Angelo Colaco (SESA)
  Arata Izumi (Pune)
  Aslon Oliveira (Salgaocar)
  Babun Das (United)
  Britto PM (Indian Navy FC)
  Cajetan Fernandes (Sporting Goa)
  Dhanpal Ganesh (Pune)
  Emmanu Elchinedu (Vasco)
  Eugeneson Lyngdoh (Bengaluru)
  Gilbert Oliveira (Salgaocar)
  Jaison Vaz (SESA)
  Joseph Clemente (Sporting Goa)
  Melwyn Fernandes (SESA)
  Neil Gaikwad (Air India)
  Pankaj Sona (Churchill Brothers)
  Ramanlal (Indian Navy FC)
  Riyadh B (Indian Navy FC)
  Ryuji Sueoka  (Pune)
  Siddharth Nayak (Air India)
  Shankar Oraon (United)
  Thangjam Singh (Salgaocar)
  Thongkhosiem Haokip (Pune)
  V Lalchhuanmawia (Indian Navy FC)

References

External links
 Official website 

 
2014–15 in Indian football
Football in Goa
2014
2014 domestic association football cups